Constantine Manetas (born 7 January 1980) is a Greek fencer. He competed in the individual and team sabre events at the 2004 Summer Olympics.

References

1980 births
Living people
Greek male fencers
Olympic fencers of Greece
Fencers at the 2004 Summer Olympics